Alex Gasperoni (born 30 June 1984) is a Sammarinese footballer who currently plays as a midfielder for A.C. Libertas. He is a former Sammarinese international.

Career
Gasperoni represented the San Marino national football team from 2003 to 2019.

He was part of Tre Penne's squad in their 1–0 win over Shirak F.C. of Armenia in the first qualifying round of the 2013–14 UEFA Champions League. It was the first win by a Sammarinese club in European competition.

International goals
Scores and results list San Marino's goal tally first.

References

1984 births
Living people
Sammarinese footballers
San Marino international footballers
A.S.D. Victor San Marino players
S.S.D. Castel San Pietro Terme Calcio players
A.S.D. Mezzolara players
A.S.D. Riccione 1929 players
S.S. Murata players
S.P. Tre Penne players
A.C. Libertas players
Association football midfielders
Sammarinese expatriate footballers
Expatriate footballers in Italy